The 1999 Philippine Basketball Association (PBA) Commissioner's Cup was the second conference of the 1999 PBA season. It started on June 27 and ended on September 15, 1999. The tournament is an Import-laden format, which requires an import or a pure-foreign player for each team.

Format
The following format will be observed for the duration of the conference:
One-round eliminations; 8 games per team. 
Quarterfinals: top 4 seeded teams will have twice-to-beat advantage
QF1: #1 vs. #8
QF2: #2 vs. #7 
QF3: #3 vs. #6 
QF4: #4 vs. #5
Best-of-five semifinals: winners of each pairings
QF1 vs QF4
QF2 vs.QF3
For third-place: one-game playoff 
Finals: best-of-seven series

Elimination round

Team standings

Schedule

Bracket

Quarterfinals

(1) Alaska vs. (8) Mobiline

(2) Shell vs. (7) Purefoods

(3) Sta. Lucia vs. (6) Barangay Ginebra

(4) San Miguel vs. (5) Tanduay

Semifinals

(1) Alaska vs. (4) San Miguel

(2) Shell vs. (3) Sta. Lucia

Third place playoff

Finals

References

External links
 PBA.ph

PBA Commissioner's Cup
Commissioner's Cup